John Percy "Jack" Blake (13 November 1874 – 19 December 1950) was a British local politician and sportsman. He competed for the United Kingdom at fencing at the 1908, 1912 and 1920 Summer Olympics. He was also a keen player of water polo and an amateur boxer. In 1911, he won the épée title at the British Fencing Championships.

During the First World War Blake was in charge of the priority section of the High Explosives Section of the Ministry of Munitions. In 1919 he was elected to the London County Council as Progressive Party councillor representing Islington. He was re-elected for a second three-year term in 1922, and joined the Labour Party in 1924. From 1925 to 1931 he was a councillor representing Camberwell, Peckham. He lost his seat at the 1931 county council elections, but returned to the LCC as an alderman in 1934, holding his seat until 1946. He was Chairman of the London County Council for 1942–43. He was a member of the LCC Entertainments and Fire Brigade Committees, and of the Port of London Authority.

Olympic events
 1908 Summer Olympics in London	
 Fencing – Épée, individual
 1912 Summer Olympics in Stockholm
 Fencing – Épée, individual
 Fencing – Épée, team – Silver medal
 1920 Summer Olympics in Antwerp
 Fencing – Épée, individual
 Fencing – Épée, team

References

1874 births
1950 deaths
British male fencers
Olympic fencers of Great Britain
Olympic silver medallists for Great Britain
Olympic medalists in fencing
Medalists at the 1912 Summer Olympics
Fencers at the 1908 Summer Olympics
Fencers at the 1912 Summer Olympics
Fencers at the 1920 Summer Olympics
People from Richmond, London
Sportspeople from London
Members of London County Council